Shlisselburgsky Uyezd (Шлиссельбургский уезд) was one of the subdivisions of the Saint Petersburg Governorate of the Russian Empire. It was situated in the northeastern part of the governorate. Its administrative centre was Shlisselburg. In terms of present-day administrative borders, the territory of Schlisselburgsky Uyezd is divided between the Kirovsky, Vsevolozhsky and Tosnensky districts of Leningrad Oblast.

Demographics
At the time of the Russian Empire Census of 1897, Shlisselburgsky Uyezd had a population of 54,904. Of these, 55.3% spoke Russian, 39.3% Finnish, 1.8% German, 1.7% Estonian, 0.6% Polish, 0.3% Yiddish, 0.3% Latvian, 0.2% Belarusian, 0.1% Ukrainian, 0.1% French, 0.1% Swedish and 0.1% English as their native language.

References

 
Uezds of Saint Petersburg Governorate
Saint Petersburg Governorate
History of Leningrad Oblast